Complexin-1 is a protein that in humans is encoded by the CPLX1 gene.

Function 

Proteins encoded by the complexin/synaphin gene family are cytosolic proteins that function in synaptic vesicle exocytosis.  These proteins bind syntaxin, part of the SNAP receptor.  The protein product of this gene binds to the SNAP receptor complex and disrupts it, allowing transmitter release.

Interactions 

CPLX1 has been shown to interact with SNAP-25 and STX1A.

References

External links

Further reading